Greyson Michael Chance (born August 16, 1997) is an American singer-songwriter and musician. He rose to national attention in 2010 with his performance of Lady Gaga's "Paparazzi" at a grade school music festival which went viral on YouTube, gaining over 71million views. Two of his original compositions, "Stars" and "Broken Hearts", gained over six and eightmillion views respectively on his channel. Chance's debut single, "Waiting Outside the Lines", was released in October 2010 followed by his debut studio album, Hold On 'til the Night, in August 2011.

Chance released his second extended play, Somewhere Over My Head, in May 2016. The lead single, "Afterlife", was released in October 2015, followed by "Hit and Run" and "Back On the Wall" in 2016. In March 2019, Chance released his second full-length album, Portraits with the lead single, "Shut Up", followed by "Timekeeper".

Early life
Chance was born August 16, 1997, in Wichita Falls, Texas, and grew up as a Catholic in Edmond, Oklahoma. The youngest child of Scott and Lisa Chance, he has an older sister, Alexa, and an older brother, Tanner, both of whom also make music. Chance began playing the piano at age eight and had several years of piano lessons before he first went viral.

Career

1997–2010: Musical beginnings 
Chance's cover of Lady Gaga's "Paparazzi" was posted to YouTube on April 28, 2010, and for almost two weeks, the video generated low views. At least two social websites, GossipBoy.ca and reddit.com, posted video embeds on May 10, 2010. The next morning, it was embedded on ryanseacrest.com, which reported finding the video via BuzzFeed, a website that attempts to track and predict emerging viral internet memes. Later in the day, TVGuide, The Huffington Post, and Yahoo! Music's video blog, Video Ga Ga, also posted articles embedding the video; TVGuide mentioned that a Facebook fan page had already been started for Chance. That afternoon, Ryan Seacrest and Ellen DeGeneres linked the video on their Twitter accounts, as did celebrity Ashton Kutcher later that evening.

DeGeneres first saw the video after Chance's brother, Tanner Chance, wrote to her show suggesting she watch it. The video had about 10,000 views when DeGeneres first saw it. On the afternoon of May 11, Yahoo! Music reported: "As of this writing, the video has had more than 36,000 views so far, and he's even been invited to perform on The Ellen DeGeneres Show. On May 12, DeGeneres' announcement of Chance's booking on the show was broadcast at different times across the U.S. and posted to her website.  The Wall Street Journal and Los Angeles Times, among other mainstream media, posted articles embedding the video and announcing the forthcoming appearance. Chance taped an interview and performance of "Paparazzi" in Los Angeles. During the interview, Chance received a phone call from Lady Gaga, who the boy says is his "true inspiration." That evening, ABC World News broadcast a report on Chance, introduced by Diane Sawyer, who said the story struck ABC News as "part Billy Elliot and part Glee." On May 13, Chance's appearance on The Ellen DeGeneres Show was broadcast, and mainstream media, including CBS and People, reported on the appearance. That morning, Ryan Seacrest posted another link on Twitter, this time to the video of Chance appearing on The Ellen DeGeneres Show.

On May 15, Chance created an official Myspace page and an official Twitter account. Chance made a second appearance on Ellen, airing May 26, 2010, on which he performed his original song "Broken Hearts", received a $10,000 award for winning Ellen's Wonderful Web of Wonderment contest, a brand new Yamaha piano, and was announced as DeGeneres's first signed artist to her new recording label eleveneleven. While explaining her reasons for naming her record label, she listed as one reason the fact that she first saw Chance's "Paparazzi" cover on May 11, 2010. Also, she states that 11 is Chance's soccer jersey number. Guy Oseary, who manages Madonna's career, and Troy Carter, who manages Lady Gaga's career, would be co-managers of Chance's career, but no partnership with a major recording label had been finalized.

Because of his quick rise, including fast creations of fan sites, and high quality of the videos, The Christian Science Monitor examined the story to see if it was genuine or a clever marketing campaign, ultimately stating the "video is legit." In May 2010, ITN News raised many of the same questions; highlighting aspects of Chance's "Paparazzi" video, media industry analyst Alan Stevens pointed out the growing inability within modern media culture to distinguish between videos which are produced by amateurs and videos which are produced by professionals but made to appear amateur in origin.

2010–2014: Hold On 'til the Night and Truth Be Told, Part 1

His debut single, "Waiting Outside the Lines", was released to iTunes on October 26, 2010. It was released digitally in the UK on December 9. The single also contained a remix featuring Filipino singer Jake Zyrus (then Charice), as well as studio versions of his covers of Lady Gaga's "Paparazzi" and "Fire" by Augustana. Throughout December, Chance appeared at We Day 2010 in downtown Toronto at the Air Canada Centre, where he performed the latter, and visited both Paris and London, appearing on local radio stations and giving private concerts in both cities. On February 5, 2011, Chance entered the National spotlight again with a performance of "Waiting Outside the Lines" on CBS's Early Show, while stopping through New York on Miranda Cosgrove's Dancing Crazy Tour. He then started the Waiting 4U tour with Australian pop/R&B singer Cody Simpson on April 9 in Ivins, Utah. The tour ended on May 18, 2011, in Portland, Oregon.

On May 17, 2011, his second single, "Unfriend You", was released to iTunes and, on May 23, Chance visited The Ellen DeGeneres Show to premiere the single. After the performance, Chance revealed a solid release date for his upcoming debut album, Hold On 'Til the Night, which was released on August 2, 2011. The music video features an appearance by Ariana Grande.

On September 15, he again appeared on The Ellen DeGeneres Show to talk about his album, and also revealed that he had taken his first steps into acting, portraying a younger version of Jimmy Chance, the protagonist of Fox's comedy Raising Hope, in the series' second-season premiere. The episode aired on September 20, 2011.

In November 2011, Chance undertook a tour of Southeast Asia to promote his album, which had just been released in the region. The tour started in Kuala Lumpur, Malaysia, where in addition to a showcase performance he was invited to perform at the Malaysian Music Industry Awards show (the first foreign artist so invited since 1999) with Malaysia YouTube sensation, Najwa Latif, Chance also gave performances in Singapore; Kota Kinabalu (Borneo, Malaysia); Manila, Philippines; and Jakarta, Indonesia.

In March 2012, Chance returned to Asia to support the release of a special edition of the album, which was released to the Asian market on March 20. He was accompanied by his full four-part band and gave full concert performances in Kuala Lumpur, Singapore, Jakarta, and Manila, before going on without the band on a promotional tour to Taiwan, Hong Kong, and Bangkok, Thailand. In early July, he was back in the region for promotional and TV appearances in Hong Kong and Changsha (Hunan, China). In August, he performed at the MTV-CCTV Mandarin Music Awards show in Beijing and won the award for Most Popular New International Artist of the Year.

In November 2012, after releasing his new EP, Truth Be Told Part 1, he again returned to Asia for a promo tour starting in Kota Kinabalu (Borneo, Malaysia) to Kuala Lumpur, Malaysia, Singapore and Manila, Philippines.

2014–2018: Somewhere Over My Head

On January 13, 2014, Chance released a new song named "Temptation" onto his SoundCloud. He performed the song at the Sundance Film Festival.  Throughout the year, he continued the process of writing and recording his EP, Somewhere Over My Head. On September 16, Chance released a single called "Thrilla In Manila". Another track named "Meridians" was released on March 24, 2015. Both songs, ultimately, did not appear on the final track list. The official lead single, "Afterlife", was released on October 29, 2015. In 2016, it was succeeded by "Hit & Run" on February 5 and "Back On the Wall" on April 29 as the second and third singles, respectively. On April 28, he released a new music video for his single "Back On The Wall" on his YouTube channel. The EP was released May 13, 2016.

Before the release of Somewhere Over My Head, from January 27 to February 1, 2016, Chance performed three shows in Los Angeles, Chicago and New York City. He had a release party of his new EP in YouTube Space LA on May 13, 2016. And on May 28–29, he had another two shows after the release of the EP in San Francisco and Seattle.

During promotion of the EP, Chance was also featured on an electronic dance track by tyDi and Jack Novak titled "Oceans", which was released on February 19, 2016.

In February 2016, he was picked as Elvis Duran's Artist of the Month and was featured on NBC's Today show hosted by Kathie Lee Gifford and Hoda Kotb and broadcast nationally where he performed live his single "Hit & Run".

In June 2016, one month after releasing his new EP, Somewhere Over My Head, Chance returned to Asia for a short promo tour starting in Singapore, Kuala Lumpur and Penang in Malaysia, and Manila, Philippines.

On September 15, 2016, Frank Pole released a song titled "Anything" which featured Chance. On December 23, 2016, Chance released a song called "London". On May 6, 2017, Chance is also featured on Fabian Mazur's song called "Earn It". On May 12, 2017, Chance's cover of "Hungry Eyes" was released as part of the soundtrack album for the television film remake of Dirty Dancing. On June 30, 2017, Chance released a song called "Seasons".

On December 8, 2017, Chance released his single "Low," and on May 4, 2018, he released his single "Lighthouse", collaborating with Danish-American DJ & music producer Fabian Mazur. Another single was released on June 8, 2018, called "Good As Gold".

2019–present: Portraits, Trophies, and Palladium

On March 15, 2019, he released his second studio album, Portraits. Due to his success independently, Chance signed his second major record deal with Sony Music Global and Arista Records, which will release any subsequent material he produces, in June 2019. In the same month he also announced a world tour promoting Portraits.

On January 15, 2021, Chance released "Holy Feeling", the lead single from his upcoming extended play. The second single, "Hellboy", was released on April 23. Chance announced on April 29 that his third extended play, Trophies, would be released on June 25, 2021. In May, he announced he would be embarking on the Trophies World Tour, visiting various cities in North America and Europe over 2021 and 2022.

In March 2022, it was announced that Chance would make his feature film debut, starring in Maybelline Prince.

Chance's third studio album, Palladium, was released on September 22, 2022.

Personal life
In 2017, Chance was attending the University of Tulsa and majoring in history, but he later dropped out to focus on music. On July 19, 2017, Chance came out as gay in an Instagram post. On August 14, 2020, Chance revealed he struggles with anorexia nervosa.

In 2022, in an interview with Rolling Stone, he accused DeGeneres of being manipulative and felt "completely abandoned" by her by the time his second album was released.

Discography

Studio albums

Extended plays

Singles

As lead artist

As featured artist

Promotional singles

Music videos

Tours
Headlining

Hold On 'Til the Night Tour (2011–2012)
Portraits World Tour (2019–2020)
Trophies World Tour (2021–2022)
Palladium World Tour (2022–2023)

Co-headlining

 Waiting 4U Tour (2011)

Opening

 Dancing Crazy Tour (2011)

Awards and recognition

Notes

References

External links
 Official website
 
 

 
1997 births
21st-century American singers
21st-century American LGBT people
American child singers
American gay musicians
American male pianists
American male pop singers
American male singer-songwriters
American pop pianists
American YouTubers
Child pop musicians
Internet memes
LGBT people from Oklahoma
LGBT people from Texas
American LGBT singers
Living people
Music YouTubers
People from Edmond, Oklahoma
People from Wichita Falls, Texas
Shorty Award winners
Singer-songwriters from Oklahoma
Singer-songwriters from Texas
University of Tulsa alumni